Riverdale is a river valley neighbourhood located just east of the downtown core in the city of Edmonton, Alberta, Canada.  Its boundaries on the east and south are the North Saskatchewan River from which the name of the community is associated with.  Immediately across the river to the south is another Edmonton river valley neighbourhood--Cloverdale.  Riverdale shares the approaches to the Low Level Bridge with a third river valley neighbourhood, Rossdale.  To the north, is the neighbourhood of Boyle Street.  Riverdale's boundary with the downtown core runs approximately along Grierson Hill Road.

The community is represented by the Riverdale Community League, established in 1920, which maintains a community hall and outdoor rink located at 92 Street and 100 Avenue. The Riverdale Community League also publishes a regular community newsletter, The Riverdalian.

Demographics 

Residential development 
The neighbourhood was a popular site with early residents of the city of Edmonton, and soon had both a lumbermill and brickyard with fuel supplied by coal mined from nearby cliffs in the river valley.

A neighbourhood restaurant, Little Brick Cafe and General Store, opened in 2015 and is named as a nod to the area's brickyard roots.

There is one elementary school, Riverdale School, located in the neighbourhood.

The neighbourhood also has several parks:  Allan Stein Park, Dawson Park, Louise McKinney Riverfront Park, and Riverdale Park.

See also 
 Edmonton Federation of Community Leagues
 Edmonton's historic river valley neighbourhoods:
 Cloverdale
 Rossdale

References

External links 
 Riverdale Neighbourhood Profile
 Riverdale Community League

Neighbourhoods in Edmonton